Frederick Spaulding Coolidge (December 7, 1841 – June 8, 1906) was a U.S. Representative from Massachusetts and the father of United States Senator Marcus Allen Coolidge.

Biography
Born to Charles and Nancy (Spaulding) Coolidge in Westminster, Massachusetts, he was a descendant on his father's side of Thomas Hastings (colonist) who came from the East Anglia region of England to the Massachusetts Bay Colony in 1634.  Coolidge attended the common schools.
He began his career working at his father's chair factory, however in 1876 his father's factory burned down.  After the destruction of his father's factory Coolidge became manager of the Boston Chair Manufacturing Co. in Ashburnham, Massachusetts  and later of the Leominster Rattan Works.
Coolidge was a member of the Board of Selectmen of his native town for three years.
He served as member of the Democratic State Central Committee.

Coolidge served as member of the Massachusetts House of Representatives in 1875.

Coolidge was elected as a Democrat to the Fifty-second Congress (March 4, 1891 – March 3, 1893).

While in Congress Coolidge served on the Committee on Pacific Railroads and on the Select Committee on Irrigation of Arid Lands in the United States.
He was an unsuccessful candidate for reelection in 1892 to the Fifty-third Congress.
He retired from active business pursuits.

His daughter, Cora Helen Coolidge, went on to be president of Pennsylvania College for Women (now Chatham University).

Death and burial
Coolidge died in Fitchburg, Massachusetts, on June 8, 1906.  He was interred in Mount Pleasant Cemetery, Westminster, Massachusetts.

See also
 1875 Massachusetts legislature

Footnotes

Bibliography
Buckminster, Lydia N. H.: The Hastings Memorial, A Genealogical Account of the Descendants of Thomas Hastings of Watertown, Mass. from 1634 to 1864, Boston: Samuel G. Drake Publisher (an undated NEHGS photoduplicate of the 1866 edition).
Fulham, Volney Sewall (1909), The Fulham Genealogy: With Index of Names and Blanks for Records, Burlington, VT: Free Press Printing Co., pp. 132–133

External links

 Descendants of Thomas Hastings website
 Descendants of Thomas Hastings on Facebook

1841 births
1906 deaths
Democratic Party members of the Massachusetts House of Representatives
People from Westminster, Massachusetts
Politicians from Fitchburg, Massachusetts
Democratic Party members of the United States House of Representatives from Massachusetts
19th-century American politicians
Coolidge family